WFFT-TV (channel 55) is a television station in Fort Wayne, Indiana, United States, affiliated with the Fox network. Owned by Allen Media Broadcasting, the station maintains studios and transmitter facilities on Hillegas Road in Fort Wayne.

History

As an independent station
The station signed on the air on December 21, 1977 as an independent station. Many shows on WFFT during its early days had not been seen in the market since their original airing on network television; among the classic series it aired were The Little Rascals, Superman, Batman, Battlestar Galactica, Star Trek, Night Gallery, The Wild Wild West and McHale's Navy. For a time, the station carried ABC shows that were preempted by WPTA (channel 21), which usually included shows that were part of the ABC Late Night block.

In January 1978, just one month after it signed on, the Midwestern United States suffered through a snowstorm known as the "Great Blizzard of 1978". Due to the severity of the storm, engineers were trapped at the station, and rather than sign off the air as they normally would, they got permission from management to simply continue transmitting. They filled the time with information about the weather situation (to the degree that they could given their limited resources), and public domain films and videos from the station's library. The appeal of 24-hour broadcasting was so popular, it later ended up staying on the air all night each Friday and Saturday on a regular basis during a time when the other Fort Wayne stations would sign-off for the night around 1:00 or 2:00 a.m.; it filled the overnight timeslot with a feature film showcase called Nite Owl Theatre, which began with the beginning refrain of "(I've Been) Searchin' So Long" by Chicago as its theme music.

In later years, Friday late nights featured classic horror movies such as: Frankenstein, Dracula, The Wolfman, The Mole People and Invasion of the Body Snatchers hosted by a character called "The Shroud" on Nightmare Theatre (of which only one episode is currently known to exist). The station provided a much-needed alternative to viewers in the Fort Wayne area (particularly younger viewers) with its array of cartoons, movies, and old sitcoms. This was especially important for those who did not have cable and could not watch regional or national superstations such as WTTV from Indianapolis or WGN-TV from Chicago.

At one time, WFFT was voted the #1 independent station in the United States, a feat that was especially remarkable since Fort Wayne was one of the smallest markets in the country at the time to have an independent station. Beginning in 1982, the station carried programming from CNN Headline News during various parts of the day, including the overnight hours on weekdays. It also provided some coverage of local events such as the Three Rivers Festival. The station also served as the official Fort Wayne outlet for Chicago Cubs baseball. WFFT was also remembered for its Happy's Place and Froggy's Pad children's programs in the 1980s and 1990s. Happy's Place was known for its two-hour block of syndicated children's programs that initially aired from 3:00 to 5:00 p.m. During programming breaks, "Happy the Hobo" would emcee children's activities from the WFFT studios. Also on the broadcast were characters such as "Froggy", "Chester T. Fox" and "Lawn Boy". Froggy's Pad was a morning show spun off from Happy's Place that featured the raspy-voiced frog puppet presenting animated shows.

Joining, leaving and rejoining Fox
WFFT became a charter affiliate of Fox at the network's launch on October 9, 1986, and was branded as "Super 55 Fox" in the early to mid 1990s; the station was carried on cable providers in the southeastern portion of the South Bend market during that time, as that region lacked a Fox affiliate until WSJV affiliated with network in October 1995. In the late-1990s, amidst the station's shift away from programming that was produced locally at its studios, the Happy's Place program was retooled. Segments were taped on location (and sometimes even in transit) and featured area attractions such as the Fort Wayne Children's Zoo. This format did not last long and the show was later cancelled. After this point, WFFT's programming apart from the Fox schedule was centered around syndicated fare including daytime talk and court shows, and reruns of network sitcoms. After the launch of UPN on January 16, 1995, WFFT began carrying the fledgling network through a secondary affiliation. The network's programming eventually moved to CBS affiliate WANE-TV (channel 15) full-time on a new second digital subchannel by the mid-2000s; when UPN and rival netlet The WB were shut down to form a combined network in 2006, WPTA gained the resulting CW affiliation for its own subchannel. WFFT changed its on-air branding from "Fox 55" to "Fox Fort Wayne" on January 1, 2008 to reflect its various cable channel positions in the market.

Fox announced on June 20, 2011 that it would end its affiliation with WFFT and sister station KSFX-TV (now KOZL-TV) in Springfield, Missouri; its Fort Wayne affiliation moved to MyNetworkTV affiliate WISE-DT2 on August 1. Nexstar had earlier lost the Fox affiliation for WTVW in Evansville, Indiana following a dispute with the network over retransmission consent fees that it wanted its stations to pay to the network. WFFT, along with WXIN in Indianapolis, had been the longest-tenured Fox affiliates in Indiana (Nexstar later voluntarily disaffiliated another Indiana station, WFXW—now WAWV-TV—in Terre Haute, from Fox in favor of switching the station's affiliation back to ABC, the network it was affiliated with until 1995). The last Fox program to air on WFFT was a repeat of American Dad! on July 31, 2011.

On July 25, 2011, Nexstar Broadcasting filed an antitrust lawsuit against Granite Broadcasting, claiming that the company tried to monopolize advertising sales through its shared services agreement with WPTA (owned by Malara Broadcast Group) and the five network affiliations shared between WPTA and WISE-TV (WPTA carries ABC on its primary channel and The CW on a second digital subchannel, while WISE-TV carries NBC on its primary channel as Fox and MyNetworkTV shared that station's second digital subchannel). Nexstar sought a judgment to force either WPTA-TV or WISE-TV to give up at least one of the three Big Four affiliations they had (the impetus of the lawsuit became ironic as Nexstar, which itself maintains outsourcing agreements with stations it does not own outright in most of the markets where it does own a TV outlet, later created a virtual quadropoly composed of four network-affiliated stations in Little Rock, Arkansas through its 2012 acquisition of 15 stations from Newport Television).

WFFT reverted to independent status on August 1, 2011, which made Fort Wayne one of the only television markets in the United States with all three legacy broadcast networks (ABC, CBS and NBC) with primary affiliations, and all three current post-1986 networks (Fox, The CW and the MyNetworkTV programming service) carried as digital multicast channels in a market with four commercial full-power stations. As an independent, the station filled its prime time schedule with a mix of entertainment newsmagazines and sitcoms on weeknights, a two-hour "Saturday Crimetime" block of police procedural series on Saturdays and family movies on Sundays. On February 6, 2013, as part of a settlement of Nexstar's lawsuit against Granite, the company announced that the Fox affiliation would return to WFFT; the switch was effectively reversed on March 1, 2013, making WFFT the only former Fox affiliate owned or managed by Nexstar that was affected by the 2011 dispute with Fox to rejoin the network. The first Fox program to air on WFFT when it rejoined the network was an episode of Kitchen Nightmares.

Nexstar announced on June 13, 2016 that it would sell WFFT-TV and four other stations to Heartland Media, through its USA Television MidAmerica Holdings joint venture with MSouth Equity Partners, for $115 million. The sale was required as part of Nexstar's planned merger with Media General to comply with Federal Communications Commission (FCC) ownership caps; Media General was the owner of rival WANE-TV. In early March 2018, the station removed the "Local" branding originated during its Nexstar ownership and independent period, returning to the previous "Fox 55" branding.

News operation

WFFT presently broadcasts seven hours of locally produced newscasts each week (with one hour each on weekdays, Saturdays and Sundays); in addition, the station also airs a half-hour weekly sports wrap-up show, titled The Locker Room, airing on Sunday evenings after the 10 p.m. newscast.

For most of the station's history, WFFT did not have a regular newscast. In 1980, it formed its initial news department and aired a half-hour prime time news program known as The 10 O’Clock Report; this was established during a time of heavy competition from other newscasts. As an independent, WFFT did not have network shows that could lead into its newscast, so consistent viewership and ratings were difficult to maintain. The news team consisted of only five people, and personnel would shoot and edit their own video. After that broadcast's cancellation a year later, WFFT delivered news bulletins in prime time for almost two decades.

On April 6, 2009, the station launched its second news operation and prime time broadcast known as Fox Fort Wayne News First at 10 (now Fox 55 News First at 10 since March 2018). It was the last Fox affiliate in Indiana to launch a news department, but the only local affiliate in the country to launch a new newscast in 2009. Airing for 35 minutes on weeknights and anchored by broadcast veteran Jim Blue, the show competed with a half-hour 10 p.m. newscast on WISE-DT2 that was produced by WPTA and WISE-TV's Indiana's NewsCenter operation. As with the 1980 production, personnel served as multi-platform journalists, shooting and editing their own stories. There was no sports department until the newscast's expansion following the loss of the Fox affiliation. The newscast was the only one in Fort Wayne to receive an Emmy Award nomination for "Best Evening Newscast" from the National Academy of Television Arts and Sciences-Lower Great Lakes Chapter that year.

When the station became an independent on August 1, 2011, WFFT expanded the 10 p.m. newscast to one hour; the newscast then expanded to weekend evenings on October 1, 2011 (also running for one hour); the Thursday preceding the latter expansion (September 29), WFFT became the first television station in the Fort Wayne market to begin broadcasting its local newscasts in high definition.

Blue eventually left WFFT, returning to WNWO-TV in Toledo, Ohio. Dan Ball took over as the news director following Blue's departure after a turbulent departure from KSNV-TV in March 2012. Ball was the news director from January 2013 until leaving two years later in January 2015 for KMIR-TV in Palm Springs, California.
Audra Streetman temporarily took over as the main news anchor before leaving in May 2015 to also join KMIR-TV. Streetman and Blue currently co-anchor the 5–7 a.m. morning show.

On February 13, 2023, WFFT began airing hour-long 5 p.m. and 6 p.m. local newscasts, marking the news department's first expansion in over a decade.

Technical information

Subchannels
The station's digital signal is multiplexed:

Analog-to-digital conversion
WFFT began broadcasting its digital signal on UHF channel 36 in 2003. Until December 2007, the signal transmitted programming only in standard definition at an effective radiated power of 980 watts limiting reception to within miles of the station. In May 2009, the digital signal was upgraded to full power. It now broadcasts high definition programming in the 720p format, although it aired in 1080i between leaving and rejoining the Fox network.

WFFT shut down its analog signal, over UHF channel 55, at 6:01 p.m. on June 12, 2009, the official date in which full-power television stations in the United States transitioned from analog to digital broadcasts under federal mandate. The station's digital signal remained on its pre-transition UHF channel 36. Through the use of PSIP, digital television receivers display the station's virtual channel as its former UHF analog channel 55, which was among the high band UHF channels (52-69) that were removed from broadcasting use as a result of the transition.

On January 1, 2014, WFFT began carrying Bounce TV on a newly created digital subchannel 55.2.

On March 19, 2018, WFFT began carrying Antenna TV on digital channel 55.3. The network was previously seen on WANE-DT2 from 2011 to 2017.

Out-of-market carriage and removal from out-of-market cable providers
As of March 2012, WFFT is only available over-the-air in Grant County. Despite this, WFFT was formerly carried by Bright House Networks in Marion, along with WXIN.

From January 2009 until WFFT's signal was removed by Bright House Networks systems in Grant County in March 2012, the station and WFWA remained on the cable system as well as Comcast in Blackford County (both with WXIN in-market). This was due to contractual agreements by the Fox network itself which disallow signal duplication of network programming by an out-of-market signal despite the station's longtime service to each area, a source of controversy already in other duplicative market areas in the past, as was the case in October 2008 when WANE-TV was pulled from Bright House.

WFFT, and all other Fort Wayne television stations, also have had their coverage in Ohio limited to Paulding County and Van Wert County since about 2000 due to the presence of network-affiliated stations in Lima, Ohio as well as Dayton and Toledo.

References

External links
 

Fox network affiliates
Bounce TV affiliates
Antenna TV affiliates
Entertainment Studios
FFT-TV
Television channels and stations established in 1977
1977 establishments in Indiana